Dolgorjavyn Otgonjargal is a Mongolian freestyle wrestler. She won the silver medal in the women's 50kg event at the 2022 World Wrestling Championships held in Belgrade, Serbia. She won one of the bronze medals in the women's 50 kg event at the 2021 World Wrestling Championships in Oslo, Norway.

In January 2022, she won one of the bronze medals in the women's 50 kg event at the Golden Grand Prix Ivan Yarygin held in Krasnoyarsk, Russia. In February 2022, she also won one of the bronze medals in the women's 50 kg event at the Yasar Dogu Tournament held in Istanbul, Turkey.

References 

Living people
Mongolian female sport wrestlers
World Wrestling Championships medalists
2001 births
21st-century Mongolian women